Upston Junior Edwards (born 12 October 1989) is a Jamaican international footballer who plays for Central F.C., as a defender.

Career

Club 
Edwards has played club football for Portmore United. Edwards played for Waterhouse while on loan in 2014. In 2015, he was loaned to Central F.C. in Trinidad.

International 

He made his international debut for Jamaica in 2013.

References

1989 births
Living people
Jamaican footballers
Jamaica international footballers
Association football defenders
Portmore United F.C. players
2014 Caribbean Cup players
National Premier League players